Monterey Country Club, built before 1885, is home to one of the oldest golf courses in the United States.

The club has served as a summer retreat for many Washingtonians, and has golf, tennis, swimming, dining and clubhouse facilities. American Presidents Woodrow Wilson, Calvin Coolidge and Dwight D. Eisenhower all played the Monterey Country Club course. In 1896 Wallis Simpson was born in Square Cottage next to the old Monterey Inn directly across the road from first green. She later married Prince Edward, Duke of Windsor and became the Duchess of Windsor.

The Monterey Country Club sits upon  that were once part of a mountain swamp that was the site of military action during the civil war. At the time of the Gettysburg Campaign of 1863, there were several cavalry skirmishes in and around the area - including Emmitsburg, Maryland Fountain Dale, and Monterey Pass where the club sits.

On June 22 the first skirmish occurred along the Monterey Mountain pass near Blue Ridge Summit. An armed civilian militia encountered a detachment of Confederates under General Albert G. Jenkins. The militia was forced to retreat after a very brief skirmish. General Jenkins and his Confederate troops withdrew toward Hagerstown joining General Richard S. Ewell, who was advancing with a larger force.

Following the events at the Battle of Gettysburg, the Confederate Army retreated via Emmitsburg. On July 5, General J. E. B. Stuart's soldiers were engaged in some small skirmishes with General George Armstrong Custer's Federal soldiers as he made his way back to General Robert E. Lee's army. The mountain swamp at Monterey Pass bogged down Stuart and the Army of Northern Virginia as they retreated. The Monterey Country Club sits upon  that were once part of that swamp.

References

External links

Buildings and structures in Franklin County, Pennsylvania
Golf clubs and courses in Pennsylvania
Tennis venues in Pennsylvania
South Mountain Range (Maryland−Pennsylvania)
Tourist attractions in Franklin County, Pennsylvania